The iHeartCountry Festival is an annual music event by iHeartRadio that celebrates all things Country with performances by the genre's biggest superstars at the Frank Erwin Center in Austin, Texas. The inaugural event in 2014 was not broadcast on national television, while the 2015 edition was broadcast on NBC. The 2016 and 2017 iHeartCountry Festival aired as a TV Special on the AT&T AUDIENCE Network via DIRECTV Channel 239 or U-verse Ch 1114. The 2018 edition did appear on Fox.

Line-ups

2014
The 2014 iHeartRadio Country Festival took place on March 29, 2014. The event included performances by: Luke Bryan, Jason Aldean, Eric Church, Carrie Underwood, Lady Antebellum, Florida Georgia Line, Hunter Hayes, and Jake Owen.

2015
The 2015 iHeartRadio Country Festival took place on May 2, 2015, and featured performances by: Tim McGraw, Brad Paisley, Rascal Flatts, Darius Rucker, Little Big Town, Dierks Bentley, Brantley Gilbert, Justin Moore, and The Band Perry.

NBC televised the iHeartRadio Country Festival on NBC Wednesday, May 27, 2015. The all-star Country event was also streamed live exclusively on Yahoo Live for fans nationwide and was broadcast live on iHeartMedia's Country radio stations across the U.S.

2016
The 2016 iHeartCountry Festival took place on April 30, 2016, and featured performances by: Lee Brice, Keith Urban, Brett Eldredge, Chris Young (musician), Sam Hunt, Miranda Lambert, Florida Georgia Line, Zac Brown Band, Thomas Rhett and Cole Swindell. Tickets went on sale on January 15, 2016.

The iHeartCountry Festival aired on the AT&T AUDIENCE Network on May 13, 2016, via DIRECTV Ch 239 or U-verse Ch 1114. Plus, the all-star Country event streamed live on iHeartRadio.com/WatchATT and on iHeartMedia's Country radio stations across the U.S.

2017
The 2017 iHeartCountry Festival, A Music Experience by AT&T took place on May 6, 2017, and featured performances by: Jason Aldean, Little Big Town, Dierks Bentley, Brantley Gilbert, Rascal Flatts, Jake Owen, Lady Antebellum and Kelsea Ballerini.

The iHeartCountry Festival, A Music Experience by AT&T aired on the AT&T AUDIENCE Network on May 19, 2017, via DIRECTV Channel 239 or U-verse Channel 1114. The star-studded event was streamed live on iHeartRadio.com/WatchATT and was broadcast nationwide on iHeartMedia's Country radio stations across the U.S.

2018
The 2018 iHeartCountry Festival took place on May 5, 2018, with a lineup of Luke Bryan, Keith Urban, Maren Morris, Sugarland, Jon Pardi, and Luke Combs.

2019
The 2019 IHeartCountry Festival took place May 4, 2019 and featured performances by: Tim McGraw, Florida Georgia Line, Dan + Shay, Lauren Alaina, Chris Janson and Little Big Town.

See also
iHeartRadio Music Awards
iHeartRadio Music Festival
iHeartRadio Fiesta Latina, a spin-off to the iHeartRadio Music Festival

References

External links
 Festival website

IHeartMedia
Festivals in Austin, Texas
Music festivals established in 2014
Country music festivals in the United States
Folk festivals in the United States
Music festivals in Texas